Because the rail operators are government-assisted profit-based corporations, fares and ticketing on Singapore's Mass Rapid Transit (MRT) system are currently aimed at least in breaking even to at least compensate for their costs of running the system. The rail operators collect fares by selling electronic tickets capable of storing data, the price of which is calculated based on the distance between the start and destination stations. These prices increase in fixed stages for standard non-concessionary travel. From the information that was earlier written in these tickets, it is possible to increase the fare according to increments based on approximate distances between stations.

Stations on the MRT system are divided into two areas, paid and unpaid areas, which allows the rail operators to collect needed fares by restricting entry only through the fare gates, also known as access control gates. These gates, connected to a computer network, are able to read the electronic tickets, and can store information such as the amount of time taken per trip, and the start and destination stations of each trip. This allows the rail operators to collect fares based on this information.

Fares
Although operated by private companies, the system's fare structure is regulated by the Public Transport Council (PTC), to which the operators submit requests for changes in fares. Fares are kept affordable by pegging them approximately to distance-related bus fares, thus encouraging commuters to use the network and reduce heavy reliance on the bus system. A fare review is conducted every year, based on a formula that itself is reviewed every 5 years. Since 2021, fare formula has been revised such that there is no Network Capacity Factor (NCF) involved, but the NCF for 2021 only has January 2020 data. The formula takes into account the main factors affecting the cost of operating the public transport system, including the MRT and public buses. Fare increases have caused public concern, but fares are reduced in both 2009, 2010, 2015, 2016 and 2017. Historically, fares on the fully underground North East, Circle, and Downtown lines had been higher than those of the North South and East West lines (NSEWL), a disparity that was justified by citing higher costs of operation and maintenance on a completely underground line. However, the Public Transport Council (PTC) announced in 2016 that fares for the three underground lines would be reduced to match those on the NSEWL, which took effect along with the annual fare review, on 30 December 2016.

After the opening of Downtown line Stage 3, Transport Minister Khaw Boon Wan announced that public transport fare rules will be reviewed to allow for transfers across MRT lines at different stations due to the increasing density of the rail network. At the time, commuters were charged a second time when they made such transfers. He added that the PTC would review distance-based fare transfer rules to ensure they continue to facilitate "fast, seamless" public transport journeys. The review of distance-based fare rules on MRT lines was completed, and a waiver on the second boarding fee incurred when making such transfers was announced on 22 March 2018. The scheme was implemented on 29 December 2018.

MRT fares

Notes
Children under the age of 4 and below the height of 0.9m travels for free. Children under the age of 7 can travel for free using a child concession card.

1: Only for school smartcards, Diploma Student EZ-Link, and ITE Student EZ-Link Card only. Undergraduates have to pay adult fares, as more than 90% of the undergraduates are eligible voters.

Ticketing
Main articles: EZ-Link, NETS, and CEPAS

Tickets
Contactless smart cards fully replaced their magnetic ticket predecessors on 1 December 2002, making Singapore one of the first cities to implement contactless smart card payment on all main modes of public transportation, similar to Hong Kong.

The ticketing system uses the EZ-Link and NETS FlashPay contactless smart cards based upon the Symphony for e-Payment (SeP) system for public transit built on the Singapore Standard for Contactless ePurse Application (CEPAS) system. This system permits up to 4 card issuers to provide for the market. The EZ-Link card was introduced on 13 April 2002 as a replacement to the original TransitLink farecard, while its competitor, the NETS FlashPay card, entered the smart card market on 9 October 2009.

Stored-value card
An adult EZ-Link card may be purchased for S$12 (inclusive of a S$5 non-refundable card cost and a S$7 credit) for payment of public transportation fares in Singapore. The card may be purchased at any TransitLink ticket office or passenger service centre. The card may also be used for payment of goods and services at merchants displaying the "EZ-Link" logo, Electronic Road Pricing tolls and Electronic Parking System carparks. Additional credit may be purchased at any General Ticketing Machine (GTM), Add Value Machine (AVM), TransitLink Ticket Office, Passenger Service Centre, AXS Station, DBS/POSB Automatic Teller Machine (ATM), online via a card reader purchased separately or selected merchants. Additional credit of a predetermined value may also be automatically purchased whenever the card value is low via an automatic recharge service provided by Interbank GIRO or through a manual application at the TransitLink Ticket Office or credit card online. An option for EZ-Link Season Pass for unlimited travel on buses and trains is available for purchase and is non-transferable.

The NETS FlashPay card may be purchased at all TransitLink Ticket Offices at MRT stations, retail points such as 7-Eleven stores, Cheers and Fairprice Xpress as well as iNETS Kiosks. It can be used for the payment of public transportation fares in Singapore and at merchants displaying the "NETS FlashPay" logo.

Account-based ticketing
On 20 March 2017, LTA started a trial of the usage of contactless debit and credit MasterCard cards for fare payments on all main modes of public transport. Fares are charged directly to their debit or credit cards. From 3 December 2018, the trial was expanded to NETS and Visa cards. On 7 March 2019, the system was renamed to SimplyGo, and it was officially launched on 4 April 2019, starting with MasterCard holders. As of November 2019, Visa and NETS card holders are also able to utilise the system.

Standard ticket

First-generation standard ticket
A standard ticket contactless smart card for single trips may also be purchased between S$2 and S$4 (inclusive of a S$1 refundable card deposit) for the payment of MRT and LRT fares. The card may be only purchased at the GTM. The deposit may also be retrieved by returning the card to the GTM within 30 days from the date of issue or donated to charity by depositing it in a collection box at any station. This card cannot be recharged with additional credit.

Second-generation standard ticket

A paper-based standard ticket contactless smart card for single/return trips may be purchased between S$1.10 and S$7 (inclusive of a S$0.10 refundable card deposit) for the payment of MRT and LRT fares. The card may only be purchased at the GTM. Unlike the first generation Standard Ticket, this second generation Standard Ticket can be recharged with additional credit for up to 6 trips within 30 days from the date of issue. The deposit will be refunded upon recharging the card for the third trip at the GTM. A further S$0.10 rebate will be given upon recharging the card for the sixth and final trip at the GTM. Credit purchased for the single/return trips must be used on the same day of purchase. For commuters who purchased credit for the return trip, but did not return to the original station on the 'return trip', they can top up the fare difference at the destination station if the purchased credit is less than value of the trip. 

Sales of the standard tickets will be phased out between January 2022 and March 2022. TransitLink Service Agents began to be deployed again from 27 December 2021 at various stations. The Thomson-East Coast Line and Downtown Line phased out sales of the standard tickets on 10 January 2022. The Circle Line, North East Line, Sengkang LRT and Punggol LRT phased out on 10 February 2022. The North South Line, East West Line and Bukit Panjang LRT phased it out last on 10 March 2022. As of 11 March 2022, standard tickets cannot be bought and commuters have to use other methods to pay for their fare.

Singapore Tourist Pass & 7 Singapore Pass
A Singapore Tourist Pass and 7 Singapore Pass contactless smart card may be purchased from S$10 (inclusive of a S$10 refundable card deposit and a 3-day pass) for the payment of public transportation fares including sightseeing bus routes under Singapore Ducktours. The card may be purchased at selected TransitLink Ticket Offices, LTA Kiosks, Passenger Service Centres and Singapore Visitors Centres, and can be refunded at both TransitLink Ticket Offices and Passenger Service Centres.

Access-control gates
Access-control gates found in Singapore's MRT and LRT stations have evolved in design & features over the years. A few different series of gates from different manufacturers have been used in MRT and LRT stations. The two oldest generations of these gates in the MRT stations began to be removed starting from March 2010, and this was completed by October 2014.

On 22 July 2018, a hands-free ticketing technology trial was launched at 4 stations to examine the feasibility of a new hands-free fare gate that allows people with disabilities to enter and exit MRT stations without tapping their fare cards. If found to be feasible, the fare gates may be introduced to more stations. The trial lasted until November 2018. A tender for a second trial was announced in February 2020, with the possibility of expanding the system to all public buses and 400 faregates should the trial be successful.

Passenger service centres
Passenger service centres are control stations that looks after the station, and handle cash top-ups for all MRT cards. By the first half of 2018, cash top-ups at all passenger service centres were phased out.

Ticketing machines

In the early years, single trip magnetic tickets were purchased at ticket vending machines with coins only. Notes could be broken up into small change at a separate change machine. Those holding magnetic multi trip farecards could only reload their cards with additional credit at manual service counters or a separate add-value machine.

The Add Value Machine originally accepts magnetic farecards, and was upgraded to the EZ-Link cards in 2002. It accepts reload of card credit via NETS only. It was upgraded to Add Value Machine Plus (AVM+) since 2013 before replacing it into the Top-Up Kiosk (TUK) in 2021. TUK is a replacement of most general ticketing machines (GTMs), top-up kiosks (TUKs) and top-up machines (TUMs). Examples of these stations are Tampines, Simei, Expo, Bedok, Aljunied, Bugis (EWL), Botanic Gardens, Stadium, Dakota, Paya Lebar, Kembangan, Chinatown (DTL), Bayfront, Bendemeer, Clementi, Orchard and Somerset. The General Ticketing Machines (GTMs) will continue to be retained, for the purpose of people who needs to top up by cash (students, seniors and tourists).

Prior to the standardization of general ticketing machines (GTMs) in 2002, the ticket vending machine also allows pushing button to select fare and accepts coins only. There are also integrated ticketing machines and touch screen ticket vending machine. The GTMs allows the passenger to top-up stored value cards, check value remaining and view past card transactions. All GTMs do not give notes change. GTMs by Cubic had been installed on all North South and East West line stations since 2002, and Circle line stations since their opening; and by Ascom, on all North East line stations since their opening. Using these machines, to buy a standard ticket, passengers selected a destination station on a touch sensitive rail map, and the fare was automatically calculated. Payment for standard tickets was in cash (coins and notes). Passengers could also top-up their EZ-Link or NETS FlashPay cards by placing it on an external reader, and topping up through cash or NETS.

In 2013, all existing GTMs were upgraded, coinciding with the release of the new Singapore third series coins. With the upgrade, a new touchscreen was introduced, replacing the old rail map format. Passengers buying a standard ticket now select their destination station on the touchscreen, either through a navigational rail map or by station name. A single trip or return trip option is available. This type of GTM accepts EZ-Link/NETS FlashPay card top-ups through contactless credit and debit cards, and contactless e-payment systems, in addition to cash and NETS. Passengers may also apply for the automatic reload service through GIRO or VISA.

See also

 Mass Rapid Transit (Singapore)

References

External links
 Fares and Ticketing

Mass Rapid Transit (Singapore)